Dong Feixia (born 17 March 1989) is a Chinese Paralympian athlete who primarily competes in throwing events. Dong won a gold medal at the 2016 and 2020 Summer Paralympics, in the women's discus throw. She also won a silver medal at the 2015 IPC Athletics World Championships in the same category.

Notes

External links
 

1989 births
Living people
Chinese female discus throwers
Chinese female javelin throwers
Chinese female shot putters
Paralympic athletes of China
Athletes (track and field) at the 2008 Summer Paralympics
Athletes (track and field) at the 2016 Summer Paralympics
Athletes (track and field) at the 2020 Summer Paralympics
Medalists at the 2016 Summer Paralympics
Medalists at the 2020 Summer Paralympics
Paralympic gold medalists for China
Paralympic medalists in athletics (track and field)
Wheelchair discus throwers
Wheelchair javelin throwers
Wheelchair shot putters
Paralympic discus throwers
Paralympic javelin throwers
Paralympic shot putters
21st-century Chinese women